Vattam is a 2022 Indian Tamil-language hyperlink action drama film directed by Kamalakannan. The film stars Sibi Sathyaraj, Andrea Jeremiah, Athulya Ravi and Shyam Prasad. Principal photography of the film commenced in around July 2018. The film is released on 29 July 2022 on Disney+ Hotstar.

Premise 
Mano decides to get dead drunk on the eve of his ex-girlfriend's Kokilavani's wedding but gets thrown out of the wine shop. He gets cheated and goes on to kidnap a random businessman named Gautham where he bumps into and eventually swaps Gautham's wife Parvathy as the hostage.

Cast 

 Sibiraj as Mano 
 Andrea Jeremiah as Parvathi
 Athulya Ravi as Kokilavani
 Vamsi Krishna as Gautham
 Bala Saravanan as Mano's friend
 Renuka as Mano's mother 
 Chaitra Reddy
 Shyam Prasad as Matthew

Production 
The shooting of the film began during July 2018 and the portions of the film were mostly shot and set in Coimbatore. Sibi Sathyaraj signed onto play the lead role while he wrapped up shooting for Ranga with Athulya Ravi and Andrea Jeremiah roped into play the pivotal roles as main female leads in the film.

Release 
The film released to mixed reviews from critics.

References

External links

2022 films
2020s Tamil-language films
Indian action films
Films shot in Coimbatore